The Countess is a 2009 French-German historical crime thriller drama written and directed by Julie Delpy, who also composed its score. It stars Delpy, Daniel Brühl and William Hurt. It is based on the life of the notorious Hungarian countess Elizabeth Báthory.

The film is the third directorial effort by Delpy, who has said of the project that "it sounds like a gothic [story] but it's more a drama. It's more focusing on the psychology of human beings when they're given power."

Plot
In 1560, Erzsébet Báthory is born into the Hungarian noble Báthory family, the daughter of general George Báthory of Ecsed. From an early age, Erzsébet's parents raise her to accept hardness and cruelty. As a teenager, Erzsébet is impregnated by a young peasant lover and is forced to watch as he is brutally tortured and executed before her eyes; Erzsébet's mother takes the child away from her directly after its birth, ensuring that she never sees him again. Erzsébet is later married to Count Ferenc Nádasdy, with whom she has three children. After Nádasdy's return from the Ottoman-Hungarian Wars, he succumbs to a disease he contracted abroad and dies.

Erzsébet, now the sole heir of her husband's vast estate, seeks recognition from the Hungarian Habsburg King Matthias II. Matthias consents reluctantly due to his considerable debt to the Countess. At a ball, she meets Count György Thurzó's 21-year-old son, István, and falls in love with him. After a night together, István is forced by his father to end the relationship and marry the daughter of a wealthy merchant in Denmark. Erzsébet, 39, believes that their age difference is to blame for the failure of the relationship. After an incident in which she is splashed with blood after striking a female servant, Erzsébet starts to believe that bathing in the blood of virgin girls can help her to reach eternal youth and beauty, a belief reinforced by her sycophantic servants who insist her skin is suddenly much smoother. To this end, her staff capture and brutally kill peasant girls to obtain their blood.

It is only when Erzsébet starts to kidnap aristocratic girls that the authorities begin an investigation. Count Thurzó is asked to investigate the incidents and he thus sends István, now a count himself, to visit Erzsébet. István reluctantly goes to visit her, and they spend a passionate night together.  István, despite his affections for the countess, still suspects the countess and when he and one of his companions discover evidence of her crime, they arrest her. During the trial, Erzsébet is found guilty and, due to her noble origin, she is sentenced to spend the rest of her life walled into her room in Čachtice Castle in total isolation. Erzsébet's staff are also found guilty, but unlike her they are put to death. All of her estate is awarded to the Count Thurzó with the exception of Čachtice, which is given to her children.

Driven by desperation after being walled in, Erzsébet Báthory commits suicide. She is then buried without a coffin in a humble grave, with no funeral ceremony. The film casts doubt on the sentence, suggesting that much of the happenings have been manipulated by Count Thurzó.

Cast
 Julie Delpy as Countess Erzsébet Báthory
 William Hurt as Count György Thurzó
 Daniel Brühl as István Thurzó
 Adriana Altaras as Aunt Klara Báthory
 Charly Hübner as Count Ferenc Nádasdy
 Anamaria Marinca as the witch Anna Darvulia
 Sebastian Blomberg as Dominic Vizakna
 Andy Gatjen as Miklos
 Rolf Kanies as Count Krajevo
 Jesse Inman as King Matthias
 Jeanette Hain as Anna Báthory
 Frederick Lau as Janos
 Henriette Confurius as Kayla
 Nikolai Kinski as The Teacher

Release

Critical reception
The Countess received negative reviews. Boyd van Hoeij wrote in Variety, "Though some individual moments work, Delpy's screenplay lacks psychological connective tissue. It never becomes clear why a powerful and intelligent woman was brought to her knees by a cute kid, only to turn murderous and possibly insane when deprived of her object of affection."

In his review for the Associated Press, Kirk Honeycutt wrote that fans of Delpy and arthouse films would be disappointed: "The film is beautifully and lovingly produced with cool, deeply burnished cinematography inside the palace and out. Costumes, editing and Delpy's music all consistently support the high tone taken toward this bloody tale. One appreciates The Countess. But it neither terrifies nor illuminates."

See also
 Elizabeth Báthory in popular culture

References

External links
 
 

2000s English-language films
2000s French films
2000s German films
2009 films
2009 biographical drama films
English-language French films
English-language German films
English-language drama films
French biographical drama films
German biographical drama films
Films directed by Julie Delpy
Films with screenplays by Julie Delpy
Cultural depictions of Elizabeth Báthory
Films set in the 1560s
Films set in the 1600s
Films set in the 1610s
Films set in Hungary
Films shot in Germany
Films shot in Romania